David Roper (born 20 June 1944 in Bradford, West Riding of Yorkshire) is a British film and television actor, best known for his roles in The Cuckoo Waltz and Leave It to Charlie. Later, he played Geoff Barnes in EastEnders (1994-95) and Bob Bradshaw in Coronation Street in 2000.

Other credits
 Aces High (1976).
 A Bit of a Do season 1 episode 3 (1989)
 Stanley's Dragon 1994 film, role - Inspector Walsh
 Downtime 1997 film – Detective
 Heartbeat Series Eight, Episode 115  (episode 13) "Forbidden Fruit", 29 November 1998 – Detective Inspector Randall
 London's Burning Series 12, Episode 5 – A. D. O. Fearnley
 Midsomer Murders Series 12, Episode 72 "The Creeper", 27 January 2010
 Holby City, Series 21, Episode 32 "When Worlds Collide", 6 August 2019
 Doctors, "The Courier", 13 May 2020 – Brian Hershey

References

External links

1944 births
Living people
English male soap opera actors
Male actors from Bradford